is a 2019 remake television series. It is a sequel of the original Yo-kai Watch series co-produced by OLM and Magic Bus. It premiered on TXN on April 5, 2019. This is the third series based on Level 5's Yo-kai Watch franchise, and the successor to Yo-kai Watch Shadowside.

It was announced on November 15, 2019, that Yo-kai Watch! would end on December 20, 2019. It was replaced with the series Yo-kai Watch Jam - Yo-kai Academy Y: Close Encounters of the N Kind on December 27 to continue the story of the most recent film, Yo-kai Watch Jam: Yo-kai Academy Y: Can a Cat Become A Hero?.

The series premiered on Animax Asia on April 24, 2019.

Plot
The series is set before the events of Shadowside with Wazzat wiping Nate Adams's memories clean. New changes include Nate owning a Yo-kai Watch Arcane and the use of Yo-kai Keystones. The show also retains its gag comedy and humor from the original series. The new series, which is more comedy focused than the original, introduces a new form of Yo-Kai, Onechanside. Onechanside Yo kai are summoned by inserting a Yo-Kai Keystone into the Yo-Kai Watch Arcane and turning it leftwards.

Anime

References

External links
 Official Yo-kai Watch! website at TV Tokyo (Japanese)

2019 anime television series debuts
TV Tokyo original programming
Yo-kai Watch
Animated television series about children
Japanese children's animated comedy television series
Japanese adult animated comedy television series
Anime television series based on video games
Magic Bus (studio)
OLM, Inc.